Roosevelt Park is a city in Muskegon County in the U.S. state of Michigan. The population was 3,831 at the 2010 census.

Geography

Demographics

2010 census
As of the census of 2010, there were 3,831 people, 1,731 households, and 979 families living in the city. The racial makeup of the city was 85.9% White, 8.4% African American, 0.6% Native American, 1.6% Asian, 1.1% from other races, and 2.4% from two or more races. Hispanic or Latino of any race were 3.9% of the population.

There were 1,731 households, of which 28.5% had children under the age of 18 living with them, 38.2% were married couples living together, 12.9% had a female householder with no husband present, 5.4% had a male householder with no wife present, and 43.4% were non-families. 37.5% of all households were made up of individuals, and 15.3% had someone living alone who was 65 years of age or older. The average household size was 2.19 and the average family size was 2.90.

The median age in the city was 38.3 years. 23.8% of residents were under the age of 18; 9.6% were between the ages of 18 and 24; 24.8% were from 25 to 44; 24.5% were from 45 to 64; and 17.2% were 65 years of age or older. The gender makeup of the city was 47.5% male and 52.5% female.

2000 census
As of the census of 2000, there were 3,890 people, 1,773 households, and 1,056 families living in the city. The racial makeup of the city was 93.34% White, 3.14% African American, 0.46% Native American, 1.05% Asian, 0.05% Pacific Islander, 0.62% from other races, and 1.34% from two or more races. Hispanic or Latino of any race were 1.95% of the population.

There were 1,773 households, out of which 24.5% had children under the age of 18 living with them, 47.5% were married couples living together, 8.9% had a female householder with no husband present, and 40.4% were non-families. 36.6% of all households were made up of individuals, and 17.3% had someone living alone who was 65 years of age or older.  The average household size was 2.16 and the average family size was 2.85.

In the city, the population was spread out, with 22.2% under the age of 18, 6.5% from 18 to 24, 26.3% from 25 to 44, 21.4% from 45 to 64, and 23.6% who were 65 years of age or older.  The median age was 41 years. For every 100 females, there were 86.3 males.  For every 100 females age 18 and over, there were 81.1 males.

The median income for a household in the city was $37,035, and the median income for a family was $47,043. Males had a median income of $36,917 versus $30,118 for females. The per capita income for the city was $19,825.  About 2.6% of families and 4.8% of the population were below the poverty line, including 6.1% of those under age 18 and 3.5% of those age 65 or over.

Images

References

Cities in Muskegon County, Michigan